Werner Lesser (22 August 1932 in Schmalkalden – 15 January 2005 in Brotterode) was an East German ski jumper who competed in the 1950s. He finished eighth in the individual large hill at the 1956 Winter Olympics in Cortina d'Ampezzo.

Lesser competed for Brotterode in East Germany, and finished third in a ski jumping event in Klingenthal in 1959.

External links
 History of Vogtland Arena from 1957 to 1992 

1932 births
2005 deaths
German male ski jumpers
Ski jumpers at the 1956 Winter Olympics
Olympic ski jumpers of the United Team of Germany
Ski jumpers at the 1960 Winter Olympics
People from Schmalkalden
Sportspeople from Thuringia